In music, Op. 59 stands for Opus number 59. Compositions that are assigned this number include:

 Beethoven – String Quartets Nos. 7–9, Op. 59 – Rasumovsky
 Chopin – Mazurkas, Op. 59
 Dvořák – Legends
 Elgar – Oh, soft was the song, Was it some Golden Star?, and Twilight
 Mendelssohn – Sechs Lieder, Op. 59
 Nielsen – Tre Klaverstykker
 Schubert – Du bist die Ruh'
 Schumann – 4 Gesänge
 Scriabin – Prelude, Op. 59, No. 2
 Sibelius – In Memoriam
 Strauss – Der Rosenkavalier
 Szymanowski – Litany to the Virgin Mary